The Group of Cameroonian Progressives (GPC) was a political alliance in Cameroon.

History
The alliance was formed by the Cameroonian National Action Movement and the Socialist Party of Cameroon. The alliance received 4.5% of the vote in the April 1960 parliamentary elections, winning seven seats.

The alliance joined Ahmadou Ahidjo's Cameroonian Union-led government in May 1960, with GPC members Charles Assalé and Charles Okala becoming Prime Minister and Foreign Minister. The alliance merged into the UC the following year.

References

Political party alliances in Cameroon
Political parties disestablished in 1961
1961 disestablishments in Cameroon
Defunct political parties in Cameroon
Political parties with year of establishment missing